The Purple Eagles were the third most improved team in the NCAA (behind Quinnipiac and Ohio State, respectively). The Purple Eagles only won 6 games in 2008-09. Compared to 2009-10, the Purple Eagles won 14 games, an 8 win improvement.

Jenni Bauer started in net in every game en route to earning First-Team All-CHA honors. Bauer’s 2.19 goals against average and .918 save percentage ranked second in the conference. Bauer was among 45 candidates nominated for the 2010 Patty Kazmaier Memorial Award (most outstanding player). Jenna Hendrikx became the first freshman to lead the Purple Eagles in goals (14) and points (24) since the 2004-05 season. Hendrix won three CHA Rookie of the Week awards and was named to the CHA All-Rookie Team

Offseason
April 7: Niagara welcomes seven newcomers for the upcoming season. The forwards are Kathleen Bortuzzo, Sarah Connelly, Daniela Dal Colle, Natasha Fryer, and Jenna Hendrikx. On defence, the newcomers are Carleah Angeles and Samantha Curk.
May 20: Niagara alumnus Chris MacKenzie has been named the head coach. The announcement was made by Niagara University's Director of Athletics Ed McLaughlin. MacKenzie will be the second head coach in the history of the program.
June 24: Niagara announced the hiring of new assistant coach Shivaun Siegl. Siegl spent the 2008-09 season as an assistant coach at Rensselaer Polytechnic Institute (RPI). Her primary duties were working with goaltenders, video analysis and recruiting.
Sept 17: Niagara has been predicted to finish fifth in the College Hockey America Preseason Coaches’ Poll, released Sept. 17 by CHA league officials.

Exhibition

Regular season
November 13: On Nov. 14, the Purple Eagles will don pink jerseys in an effort to help Pink the Rink in the annual CHA's initiative Skate for the Cure game for breast health awareness.
January 30: Niagara became only the second team all year, and the first in the CHA team to defeat Mercyhurst. The Purple Eagles defeated the Lakers 2-1. Jenni Bauer stopped 44 of 45 shots, including all 19 fired her way in the second period in what was a scoreless game until the 42nd minute. The victory was the first-ever for the Purple Eagles over a top-ranked team and their first over the Lakers since 2004. The result snapped Mercyhurst's nation-leading 16-game unbeaten streak and 26-game CHA unbeaten run.
February 17: Jenni Bauer is among 45 nominees for the Patty Kazmaier Memorial Award.

Standings

Roster

Schedule

Player stats

Skaters

Goaltenders

Postseason
On March 5, 2010, the Orange won the first playoff game in program history. Sophomore Lisa Mullan scored two goals, as the Orange defeated Niagara by a score of 5-3.

Awards and honors
Jenni Bauer, CHA Defensive Player of the Week (November 16)
Jenni Bauer, CHA Defensive Player of the Week (November 30)
Jenni Bauer, CHA Defensive Player of the Week (February 1)
Jenni Bauer, First Team All-CHA
Kathleen Bortuzzo, CHA Rookie of the Week (Week of February 22)
Daniela Del Colle, CHA Player of the Week (Week of February 15)
Jenna Hendrikx,  CHA Rookie Of The Week Award (Oct 6, 2009)
Jenna Hendrikx,  CHA Rookie Of The Week Award (Oct 26, 2009)
Jenna Hendrikx, CHA All-Rookie Team

Team awards
Goalie Jenni Bauer and forward Jennifer MacLean were named co-MVPs. 
Frances McPhail was honored with the Brother Steve Award, which is giving to the player that demonstrates dedication and commitment to the team. McPhail was part of the season-long “Pink the Rink” program to raise funds to fight breast cancer.
The Rookie of the Year award went to forward Jenna Hendrikx. 
 Daniela Dal Colle was named Most Improved Player. 
Sophomore forward Nathalie Larsen and senior defenseman Allison Malty were honored with the Jennifer Goulet Award.

See also
2009–10 College Hockey America women's ice hockey season

References

External links
Official site

Niagara
Niagara Purple Eagles women's ice hockey seasons
Niagara Purple Eagles men's basketball
Niagara Purple Eagles men's basketball